Mark Anthony Ertel (February 26, 1919 – March 1, 2010) was an American professional basketball player. He played in the National Basketball League for the Indianapolis Kautskys during the 1941–42 season and averaged 3.3 points per game. He also fought in World War II and spent his corporate career as a lifelong employee of Perfect Circle, a U.S. manufacturer of piston rings (the company is now part of Mahle GmbH).

References

1919 births
2010 deaths
American men's basketball players
United States Navy personnel of World War II
Basketball players from Indiana
Centers (basketball)
Forwards (basketball)
Indianapolis Kautskys players
Notre Dame Fighting Irish men's basketball players
People from Tipton, Indiana